
Gmina Przemków is an urban-rural gmina (administrative district) in Polkowice County, Lower Silesian Voivodeship, in south-western Poland.

Neighbouring gminas
Gmina Przemków is bordered by the gminas of Chocianów, Gaworzyce, Gromadka, Niegosławice, Radwanice and Szprotawa.

Villages
Apart from the town of Przemków, the gmina contains the villages of Jakubowo Lubińskie, Jakubowo-Węgielin, Jędrzychówek, Karpie, Krępa, Łąkociny, Łężce, Ostaszów, Piotrowice, Szklarki, Wilkocin and Wysoka.

References

Przemkow
Polkowice County